St. Michael's Churchyard, adjacent to historic St. Michael's Episcopal Church on the corner of Meeting and Broad Streets, in Charleston, South Carolina is the final resting place of some famous historical figures, including two signers of the Constitution of the United States.  The church was established in 1751 as the second Anglican parish in Charleston, South Carolina.

Interred in St. Michael's Churchyard are:
 Charles Cotesworth Pinckney (1746–1825) Colonel in the Continental Army, member of the U.S. Constitutional Convention and signer of the U.S. Constitution, U.S. Minister to France, Federalist candidate for Vice President, and later candidate for President of the United States in 1804 and 1808
 John Rutledge (1739–1800) Governor of South Carolina, 1779, member of the U.S. Constitutional Convention and signer of the U.S. Constitution, Chief Justice of U.S. Supreme Court
 Robert Young Hayne (1791–1839) Senator, Governor of South Carolina, and mayor of Charleston
 Arthur Peronneau Hayne (c. 1789–1867) U.S. Senator from South Carolina
 William Dickinson Martin (1789–1833) U.S. Congressman from South Carolina
 Mordecai Gist (1742–1792) American Revolutionary War general
 Thomas M. Wagner, Civil War Lieutenant Colonel and namesake for Battery Wagner.
 Henrietta Johnston and her second husband

Across the street is St. Michael's Church Cemetery. Interred here is Francis Kinloch (1755–1826) a delegate to Second Continental Congress from South Carolina.

J. A. W. Iusti, Frederick Julius Ortmann, and Christopher Werner were three German born forgers of wrought iron in Charleston. Iusti's creation of the St. Michael's Cemetery Gate "Sword Gate" is one of the two most notable iron gates in Charleston, the other being the "Sword Gate" by Werner.

Notes

External links
 

Anglican cemeteries in the United States
Geography of Charleston, South Carolina
Tourist attractions in Charleston, South Carolina
Protected areas of Charleston County, South Carolina
Churchyards in the United States
Cemeteries in Charleston, South Carolina